Jhonson García (born 1 October 1980) is a Dominican Republic former professional tennis player.

García featured in 26 Davis Cup ties for the Dominican Republic, between 1998 and 2011. One of his best wins came in 1999 against Costa Rica's Juan Antonio Marín, who was then ranked 69 in the world. In 2009 he won the deciding fifth rubber, over Daniel Vallverdú, in the American Zone Group II final against Venezuela, which earned the Dominican Republic promotion to Group I for the first time.

A five-time medalist at the Central American and Caribbean Games, García also represented the Dominican Republic in three editions of the region's premier multi-sport event, the Pan American Games. He made his Pan American Games debut in 1999, then in 2003 was a quarter-finalist in the singles, before making his last appearance in 2007, when he and Víctor Estrella Burgos were beaten in the bronze medal play-off for doubles.

References

External links
 
 
 

1980 births
Living people
Dominican Republic male tennis players
Central American and Caribbean Games medalists in tennis
Central American and Caribbean Games gold medalists for the Dominican Republic
Central American and Caribbean Games silver medalists for the Dominican Republic
Central American and Caribbean Games bronze medalists for the Dominican Republic
Competitors at the 1998 Central American and Caribbean Games
Competitors at the 2002 Central American and Caribbean Games
Competitors at the 2006 Central American and Caribbean Games
Pan American Games competitors for the Dominican Republic
Tennis players at the 1999 Pan American Games
Tennis players at the 2003 Pan American Games
Tennis players at the 2007 Pan American Games
21st-century Dominican Republic people